Elazar Granot (12 March 1927 – 19 September 2013) was an Israeli politician and a writer.

Biography
Born in Jerusalem during the Mandatory Palestine, Granot was educated at Pardes Hanna Agricultural High School, before moving onto the Hebrew University of Jerusalem where he studied philosophy, sociology, literature, Hebrew and Bible.

During World War II he volunteered for the Jewish Brigade, in which he served between 1944 and 1946. He also fought in the 1948 Arab-Israeli War. In 1951 he became a member of kibbutz Sasa, where he lived until 1958 when he moved to kibbutz Shoval.

Between 1962 and 1964 he served as director of the Young Leadership of Mapam, becoming the party's organisational secretary in 1975, and political secretary in 1979. In 1981 he was elected to the Knesset on the Alignment's list (Mapam was a faction within the Alignment at the time). He was re-elected in 1984, and was a member of the Foreign Affairs and Defense Committee. Although he became Mapam's secretary general in 1985, Granot lost his seat in the 1988 elections. He died in 2013 in kibbutz Shoval.

In 2016 he was accused of being a KGB agent for the Soviet Union in the Mitrokhin Archive.

External links

1927 births
2013 deaths
Jews in Mandatory Palestine
People from Jerusalem
Kibbutzniks
People from Shoval
Alignment (Israel) politicians
Mapam politicians
Hebrew University of Jerusalem alumni
Members of the 10th Knesset (1981–1984)
Members of the 11th Knesset (1984–1988)
Mandatory Palestine military personnel of World War II
Jewish Brigade personnel